Room is the second solo album (third overall album) of singer-songwriter and actress Katey Sagal.  It was originally released on June 1, 2004 by the record label Valley Entertainment.

Track listing
 "Life Goes Round" (Katey Sagal, David Ricketts) 5:12
 "Heaven Is Ten Zillion Light Years Away" (Stevie Wonder) 5:46
 "Daddy's Girl" (Sagal, Mark Goldenberg) 4:36
 "Love and Other Games of Chance" 5:00
 "Feel a Whole Lot Better" (Gene Clark) 4:10
 "Wish I Was a Kid" (Sagal, Bob Thiele) 4:31
 "For the Love of Money" (Kenny Gamble, Leon Huff, Anthony Jackson) 3:50
 "Catch the Wind" (Donovan) 2:48
 "Loving Arms" 3:35
 "I'll Be Long Gone" (Boz Scaggs) 4:11

Personnel
Katey Sagal - vocals
Cynthia Bass, Billy Valentine - backing vocals
Bob Thiele Jr. - acoustic, electric and nylon-string guitars, keyboards, harmonica, harmonium, organ, bass, dulcimer
Shane Fontayne, Val McCallum - acoustic and electric guitars
Greg Leisz - pedal steel
Mark Goldenberg - electric banjo, electric guitars, mandolin
John Philip Shenale - keyboards, organ, Wurlitzer, samples
Davey Faragher, Leland Sklar - bass
Don Was - double bass
Victor Lawrence - cello
Pete Thomas - drums, percussion
Debra Dobkin - percussion

References 

2004 albums
Katey Sagal albums